The Yellow River is a tributary of the Wisconsin River in Clark, Wood and Juneau counties in Wisconsin, in the United States.

The Yellow River originates in eastern Clark County. It flows south through Pittsville, Dexter and Babcock in Wood County, and Necedah in Juneau County. Past Necedah, it flows into Castle Rock Lake where it meets the Wisconsin River near Buckhorn State Park. In Dexterville it is dammed to create Lake Dexter. The stretch from Necedah to Castle Rock Lake has numerous oxbows.

In the Menominee language, the river is known as Mēkon-Sēpēw, "plume or feather river".

Tributaries 
Tributaries of the Yellow River include:
 Puff Creek

References

See also
List of rivers of Wisconsin

Rivers of Wisconsin
Rivers of Clark County, Wisconsin
Bodies of water of Wood County, Wisconsin